Villavallelonga (locally La Vìlla) is a village and comune in the Abruzzo region in central Italy.  A part of Marsica traditional area, it is included in the Abruzzo, Lazio and Molise National Park.

Main sights
 Giardino Botanico "Loreto Grande"

References 

Cities and towns in Abruzzo
Marsica